Negasi Haylu Abreha (born 9 May 2000) is an Ethiopian racing cyclist, who currently rides for UCI ProTeam .

Personal life
Abreha has not been able to return home since violence broke out surrounding his home town in November 2020.

Career
In 2019 Abreha won the national road racing championships beating the competition in a sprint finish. Abreha was selected to ride the 2021 UCI Road World Championships, he raced in the under-23 time trial finishing 64th. At the Giro d'Italia Giovani Under 23 in 2022 Abreha finished 14th overall as the highest placed African in the race. Abreha will join UCI ProTeam  for its inaugural season in 2023.

Major results
Sources:
2019
 1st  Road race, National Road Championships
 10th Overall Tour de l'Espoir

References

External links

2000 births
Living people
Ethiopian male cyclists